Zack Williams (6 October 1884 – 25 May 1958) was an American actor. He appeared in numerous films including leading roles as in Son of Ingagi. His career spanned silent films from the early 1920s to talkie (sound) films of the late 1940s. He appeared with other black actors in the 1929 film Hearts in Dixie.

Filmography
 The Money Changers (1920) as Wesley Shiloh Mainwaring
 The Killer (1921) as Aloysius Jackson
 The Lure of Egypt (1921) as Theodore
 The Gray Dawn (1922) as Sam
 Court Martial (1928) as Negro
 The Lady Fare (1929)
 Hearts in Dixie (1929) as Deacon
 Madonna of the Streets (1930)as Blink
 Murder in Swingtime (1937)
 Son of Ingagi (1940) as N'Gina
 Jungle Goddess (1948) as Chief M'benga

References

American film actors
African-American male actors
American male film actors
American male silent film actors
20th-century American male actors
1884 births
1958 deaths
20th-century African-American people